Maylandia benetos is a species of cichlid endemic to Lake Malawi where it is only known from the southeastern part of the lake from Mazinzi Reef.

References

benetos
Fish of Lake Malawi
Fish of Malawi
Fish described in 1997
Taxobox binomials not recognized by IUCN